Yang Sung-tae (born 26 January 1948) is a South Korean jurist and the 15th Chief Justice of the Supreme Court of Korea.

Early life and education
Born in Busan, Yang received a LL.B. from Seoul National University in 1970. He began his law career in 1975 as a judge of Seoul Civil District Court, and afterwards served as a judge in several nationwide courts. He also taught as a professor at the Judicial Research and Training Institute. He was later appointed as the Chief Judge of Busan District Court and Patent Court.

Career
During the 1997 Asian financial crisis, Yang, as the senior presiding judge of the Bankruptcy Chambers of Seoul Central District Court, ordered court supervision of bankrupt companies based on fairness and transparency. As the Vice Minister of the National Court Administration, he played a role in reforming criminal procedure.
In February 2005, he was named a Supreme Court Justice and served until February 2011. On September 25, 2011, he was inaugurated as the 15th Chief Justice of the Supreme Court of Korea.   On September 24, 2017, his term as Chief Justice ended and a successor was named by President Moon Jae-in.

Charges and arrest
By September 2018 his actions as chief justice were under investigation by the current chief justice. On January 24 he was arrested on the count of 40 charges including abuse of his authority as a judge as part of the political scandal that resulted in the impeachment of Park Geun-hye, the president of Korea during the time he was the chief justice.

Instead of Yang, a judge from a district court was appointed as the Chief Justice of the Supreme Court, and several civil lawsuits were detained in the process. The former Chief of Justice's actions increased skepticism about the independence of the judiciary.

References

Further reading

1948 births
Living people
People from Miryang
South Korean judges
South Korean criminals
Judges convicted of crimes
Chief justices of the Supreme Court of Korea
Justices of the Supreme Court of Korea
Seoul National University School of Law alumni